Ukraine competed in the Winter Olympic Games as an independent nation for the first time at the 1994 Winter Olympics in Lillehammer, Norway.  Previously, Ukrainian athletes competed for the Unified Team at the 1992 Winter Olympics.

Medalists

Sports/disciplines and athletes
Ukraine was represented in 10 out of 12 disciplines
 Alpine skiing (2; 0 males, 2 females)
 Biathlon (10; 5 males, 5 females)
 Bobsleigh (4; 4 males, 0 females)
 Cross-country skiing (1; 0 males, 1 females)
 Figure skating (10; 4 males, 6 females)
 Freestyle skiing (3; 1 male, 2 females)
 Luge (3; 2 males, 1 female)
 Nordic combined (1; 1 male, 0 females)
 Ski jumping (1; 1 male, 0 females)
 Speed skating (2; 2 males, 0 females)

Returning Olympians
 Viktor Petrenko (figure skating) – represented the "Unified Team" in 1992
 Oleksandr Bortiuk (bobsleigh) – represented the "Unified Team" in 1992
 Serhiy But (freestyle skiing) – represented the "Unified Team" in 1992
 Natalia Yakushenko (luge) – represented the "Unified Team" in 1992
 Yuriy Shulha (speed skating) – represented the "Unified Team" in 1992

Alpine skiing 

Women

Biathlon

Men

Men's 4 × 7.5 km relay

Women

Women's 4 × 7.5 km relay

 1 A penalty loop of 150 metres had to be skied per missed target.
 2 One minute added per missed target.

Bobsleigh

Cross-country skiing

Women

 2 Starting delay based on 5 km results. 
 C = Classical style, F = Freestyle

Figure skating

Men

Women

Pairs

Ice dancing

Freestyle skiing 

Men

Women

Luge

Nordic combined 

Men's individual

Events:
 normal hill ski jumping
 15 km cross-country skiing

Ski jumping

Speed skating

Men

Notes

References
Official Olympic Reports
International Olympic Committee results database
 Olympic Winter Games 1994, full results by sports-reference.com

Nations at the 1994 Winter Olympics
1994
Winter Olympics